Mladen Božović (born 1 August 1984) is a Montenegrin former professional footballer who played as a goalkeeper. Internationally, he earned 42 caps for the Montenegro national team.

Club career

Beginnings
Light enough on his feet, and quick enough with his reflexes to dominate between the sticks, Božović started out with his local club Zabjelo, and joined Budućnost Podgorica in the 2004 winter transfer window. He was later loaned to Mladost Podgorica and Kom, before returning to the club and becoming the first-choice goalkeeper in the 2006–07 season.

Partizan
On 14 January 2008, Božović was transferred to Partizan, on a four-year deal. He made his competitive debut for the club in a 2–0 home league win over Bežanija on 22 March 2008, replacing his compatriot Darko Božović in the 87th minute of the game. Until the end of the 2007–08 season, Božović became the first-choice goalkeeper, as Partizan won the double.

He played the full 90 minutes in all of his team's league fixtures in the 2008–09 campaign. In April 2009, he first broke the club record (previously held by Ivica Kralj) in consecutive minutes without conceding a goal (840 minutes), after which he became the record holder in Serbian football after not conceding a goal for 916 consecutive minutes. The previous record holder was former FK Obilić goalkeeper Nenad Lukić who did not concede a goal for 903 consecutive minutes in the 1998–99 season. He was eventually named in the team of the season and also helped Partizan win the 2008–09 Serbian Cup, collecting the double for the second year in a row. He briefly lost his place in the team to Aleksandar Radosavljević between late September and early November 2009, before again becoming Partizan's undisputed first-choice goalkeeper. In May 2010, Božović celebrated his third Serbian championship title with the club.

During his tenure with Partizan, Božović played with the club twice in the UEFA Europa League group stage: in 2008–09 and 2009–10.

Later career
On 4 June 2010, Božović moved to Hungarian side Videoton. He was a regular starter in his debut season at Sóstói Stadion, helping the club win their first championship title ever. In the following two years, Božović added three more trophies to his collection, one Ligakupa and two Szuperkupa trophies (2011 and 2012).

On 23 June 2013, Božović joined Russian club Tom Tomsk on a free transfer. He was the first-choice goalkeeper at the beginning of the 2013–14 season, before losing his place in the starting lineup. In August 2014, Božović was loaned to Khimik Dzerzhinsk. He returned to the Siberian club in December 2014, making one league appearance until the end of the 2014–15 season.

In the 2016 winter transfer window, Božović returned to his homeland and signed with Zeta. He spent the next 18 months at the club, making 50 official appearances (league and cup).

On 20 June 2017, Božović moved to Greece and signed with AEL on a two-year deal.

International career
On 3 June 2007, Božović made his international debut for Montenegro in a 0–1 loss to Colombia at the Kirin Cup. He then served as a backup goalkeeper for Vukašin Poleksić during the team's unsuccessful qualification campaign for the 2010 FIFA World Cup. Subsequently, Božović played the full 90 minutes in all of his team's UEFA Euro 2012 qualifying games, including a play-offs tie against the Czech Republic. However, Montenegro failed to reach the final tournament.

During the World Cup 2014 qualifying stage, Božović maintained his role as Montenegro's first-choice goalkeeper, appearing in eight games (out of 10), as the team finished in third place behind England and Ukraine.

In August 2016, Božović was called up to the national team after more than a year of absence. He helped Montenegro make a successful start of the World Cup 2018 qualifying phase, winning seven points in the first three games.

Personal life
After his playing career ended, Božović began suffering from poverty and depression. On 8 March 2022, he attempted suicide but survived.

Statistics

Club

International

Honours

Club
Budućnost Podgorica
 Second League of Serbia and Montenegro: 2003–04
Partizan
 Serbian SuperLiga: 2007–08, 2008–09, 2009–10
 Serbian Cup: 2007–08, 2008–09
Videoton
 Nemzeti Bajnokság I: 2010–11
 Ligakupa: 2011–12
 Szuperkupa: 2011, 2012

Individual
 Serbian SuperLiga Team of the Season: 2008–09

References

External links

 
 
 
 

1984 births
Living people
Footballers from Podgorica
Association football goalkeepers
Serbia and Montenegro footballers
Montenegrin footballers
Montenegro international footballers
FK Zabjelo players
FK Budućnost Podgorica players
OFK Titograd players
FK Kom players
FK Partizan players
Fehérvár FC players
FC Tom Tomsk players
FC Khimik Dzerzhinsk players
FK Zeta players
Athlitiki Enosi Larissa F.C. players
Second League of Serbia and Montenegro players
Montenegrin First League players
Serbian SuperLiga players
Nemzeti Bajnokság I players
Russian Premier League players
Russian First League players
Super League Greece players
Montenegrin expatriate footballers
Expatriate footballers in Serbia
Montenegrin expatriate sportspeople in Serbia
Expatriate footballers in Hungary
Montenegrin expatriate sportspeople in Hungary
Expatriate footballers in Russia
Montenegrin expatriate sportspeople in Russia
Expatriate footballers in Greece
Montenegrin expatriate sportspeople in Greece